Sportsman Channel is an American sports-oriented digital cable and satellite television network owned by the Outdoor Sportsman Group subsidiary of Kroenke Sports & Entertainment. The channel is dedicated to programming about outdoor sports, including hunting, shooting and fishing.

As of February 2015, Sportsman Channel is available to approximately 34.1 million pay television households (29.3% of households with at least one television set) in the United States.

History
The channel was launched on April 1, 2003, and was founded by Muskego, Wisconsin businessmen C. Michael Cooley and Todd D. Hansen. In June 2007, the channel was purchased by the InterMedia Outdoor Holdings group, a division of private equity group InterMedia Partners.

In March 2009, Sportsman Channel appointed InterMedia Outdoor Executive Vice President Willy Burkhardt as the channel's president.

Then, in 2014, Sportsman Channel & its parent company, InterMedia Outdoor Holdings, were acquired by Kroenke Sports & Entertainment, resulting in the company's rename to Outdoor Sportsman Group.

Programming
Programming on Sportsman Channel  includes various shows pertaining to hunting (both by archery and through firearms), fishing and firearms. An hour-long condensed version of Cam & Co., a news magazine/talk radio program produced by the National Rifle Association for SiriusXM Patriot, airs each weeknight. Most other shows on the channel air in half-hour timeslots. Sportsman Channel also airs infomercials during the overnight hours.

In September 2009, the channel announced it would carry up to 100 original programs on its schedule starting in the fourth quarter of 2009. In March 2014, the channel premiered Amazing America with Sarah Palin, an outdoor program hosted by the former Alaska governor and 2008 Republican vice presidential candidate; the program was renewed for a second season slated to air in early 2015.

Sportsman Channel HD
Sportsman Channel HD is a high definition simulcast feed of Sportsman Channel, that broadcasts in the 1080i resolution format. On January 19, 2010, the channel announced it would launch an HD simulcast feed the following week on January 25 of that year.
In February 2010, Dish Network became the first provider to carry the channel's HD feed. The HD feed is now available on various providers including AT&T, Cablevision, and Comcast.

Carriage
DirecTV began carrying the channel on January 21, 2009. AT&T U-verse added it on April 8, 2009. Dish Network started carrying Sportsman Channel on February 10, 2010.

On September 1, 2015, Verizon FiOS removed the channel from the lineup. Spectrum removed the channel from their lineup nationwide on October 30, 2017.

Former broadcast television affiliates
The Sportsman Channel was once available on some broadcast stations. However, when it reached a carriage agreement deal with DirecTV in January 2009, giving it national coverage, it became a cable and satellite only channel.

See also
 Sportsman Channel (Canadian TV channel)
 Pursuit Channel
 NBCSN - general sports network that originated as the Outdoor Life Network (OLN), in association with Outdoor Life magazine
 Outdoor Channel
 MyOutdoorTV.com

References

External links
 

Kroenke Sports & Entertainment
Companies based in Wisconsin
Sports television networks in the United States
English-language television stations in the United States
Television channels and stations established in 2003